Joe or Joseph Ross may refer to:
 Joe E. Ross (1914–1982), American actor born in New York City
 Joe Ross (baseball) (born 1993), American professional baseball player
 Joe Ross (philatelist) (contemporary), American philatelist
 Joe Ross (referee) (born 1959), English referee in the Football League
 Joseph Donovan Ross (1911–1984), politician from Alberta, Canada
 Joseph J. Ross (1841–1900), Vice President of Liberia
 Joseph Thorburn Ross (1849–1903), English artist